Hurrey is a surname. Notable people with the surname include:

 Adam Hurrey (born 1983), British journalist, author, and podcaster
 Frank Hurrey (1885–1953), Australian rules footballer
 Herbert Hurrey (1888–1961), Australian rules footballer

See also
 Hurley (surname)
 Hurney